Let's Kiss: 25th Anniversary Album is an album by the American polka band Brave Combo, released through Dentone Records on October 28, 2004. In 2005, the album won Brave Combo the Grammy Award for Best Polka Album.

Track listing
 "Dutch Hornpipe" (Full Band) (Schottische) – 2:55
 "Red River Valley" (Polka) – 3:01
 "Bumble Bee" (Polka) (Eddie Fullylove) – 2:31
 "Take Me Out to the Ballgame" (Polka) – 2:09
 "Civilized" (Waltz) (Carl Finch) – 3:16
 "Starlight" (Polka) (Joe Oberaitis) – 2:15
 "El Golpe Traidor" (Polka) (Remberto López Garza) – 3:06
 "Let's Kiss" (Csárdás) – 2:55
 "Willkommen Oktoberfest" (Polka) (Finch) – 2:53
 "Acariciame" (Polka) (Bubba Hernandez) – 2:59
 "Cherry Pink and Apple Blossom White" (Polka) (Mack David) – 2:43
 "Take Me Out to the Ballgame" (Oberek) – 2:53
 "Aja Sam" (Polka) – 3:04
 "The Simpsons" (Polka) (Danny Elfman) – 1:08
 "Dutch Hornpipe" (Dub Version) (Schottische) – 2:52

Personnel
 Jeffrey Barnes – Arranger, Clarinet, Sax (Alto), Sax (Bass), Sax (Tenor), Saxophone, Tambourine
 Matthew Barnhart – Engineer
 Nolan Brett – Mastering
 Mack David – Composer
 Eric Delegard – Engineer
 Alan Emert – Drums
 Carl Finch – Accordion, Arranger, Audio Production, Concept, Guitar, Keyboards, Liner Notes, Producer, Vocals
 Robert Greeson – Art Direction
 Bubba Hernandez – Arranger, Bass, Guitar, Guitar (Bass), Producer, Tuba, Vocals
 Danny O'Brien – Trumpet
 Wesley Kucera - Drums
 Matt Pence – Engineer
 Gary Rhamy – Engineer
 Dave Willingham – Engineer
 Lori Young – Photography

See also
 Polka in the United States

References

External links
 Brave Combo's official site

2004 albums
Brave Combo albums
Grammy Award for Best Polka Album